Mandarin Oriental Hotel Group International Limited (MOHG) is a Hong Kong hotel investment and management group focusing on luxury hotels, resorts, and residences, with a total of 33 properties worldwide, 20 of which are fully or partially owned by MOHG.

The Mandarin Oriental name was established in 1985 following the merger of Mandarin International Hotels Limited and the holding company of the hotel The Oriental, in which Mandarin had already acquired a 49% stake in 1974. Mandarin's history traces back to the 1963 opening of its namesake hotel The Mandarin (now Mandarin Oriental, Hong Kong), whereas The Oriental (now Mandarin Oriental, Bangkok) had opened in 1876 as the Kingdom of Siam's first luxury hotel.

MOHG is a subsidiary of the publicly-traded Mandarin Oriental International Limited, which itself is a subsidiary of Jardine Matheson.

History

Although 1876 was the ‘official’ opening year of the Oriental Hotel, the origin of the ‘Oriental’ side of the Mandarin Oriental can be traced back as early as 1863, when two Americans, Captain Atkins Dyer and William West, opened the Oriental Hotel in Bangkok, Siam (now Thailand): however, the original building burnt down only two years later, on 11 June 1865.

However, the history of the ‘Mandarin’ side of the group is comparatively recent: the Mandarin hotel opened only in 1963, in the Central District of Hong Kong Island. In 1973, The Excelsior Hotel, which closed in 2019, opened in Causeway Bay.

In 1974, Mandarin International Hotels Limited was formed as a hotel management company, with the intention to expand into Asia. That year, the company acquired a 49% interest in the Oriental Hotel, resulting in two "flagship" hotels for the company.

In 1985, the Company combined the two hotels under a common name, Mandarin Oriental Hotel Group. In 1987, Mandarin Oriental Hotel Group was floated on The Stock Exchange of Hong Kong under the name of "Mandarin Oriental International Limited." Mandarin Oriental International Limited, is incorporated in Bermuda, and listed in London, Singapore and Bermuda. Mandarin Oriental Hotel Group Limited, which operates from Victoria City, manages the activities of the Group's hotels.

Marketing 

Starting in September 2005, Mandarin Oriental showed the "Moments of Delight at Mandarin Oriental" at all hotels. In June 2006, the Moments of Delight video was slightly updated to add several new scenes and in October 2014, the video featured lyrics by Chinese singer,  Sa Ding Ding, accompanied by new music.

Current properties

Asia-Pacific
Mandarin Oriental, Bangkok

Mandarin Oriental, Beijing

Mandarin Oriental, Guangzhou

Mandarin Oriental, Hong Kong

 (in The Landmark, Hong Kong)

Mandarin Oriental, Jakarta

Mandarin Oriental, Kuala Lumpur

Mandarin Oriental, Macau

Mandarin Oriental, Sanya

Mandarin Oriental, Shanghai 

Mandarin Oriental, Shenzhen

Mandarin Oriental, Singapore

Mandarin Oriental, Taipei

Mandarin Oriental, Tokyo

The Americas
Mandarin Oriental, Boston

Mandarin Oriental, Canouan (Canouan, Saint Vincent and the Grenadines)

Mandarin Oriental, Miami

Mandarin Oriental, New York

Middle East and Africa
Emirates Palace (Abu Dhabi, UAE)

Mandarin Oriental, Doha

Mandarin Oriental Jumeira, Dubai

Mandarin Oriental, Marrakech

Mandarin Oriental, Bosphorus

Mandarin Oriental, Al Faisaliah Hotel Riyadh Saudi Arabia KSA

Europe 

 Mandarin Oriental, Barcelona
 Mandarin Oriental, Bodrum
 Mandarin Oriental, Costa Navarino
 Mandarin Oriental, Geneva
 Mandarin Oriental, Istanbul
 Mandarin Oriental, Lake Como
 Mandarin Oriental Hyde Park, London
 Mandarin Oriental, Luzren
 Mandarin Oriental Ritz, Madrid
 Mandarin Oriental, Milan
 Mandarin Oriental, Munich
 Mandarin Oriental, Paris

Planned and past properties

Planned
Within the next five years, Mandarin Oriental plans to open hotel properties in Beijing (Zhengyangmen), Makati, Nanjing, Phuket, Saigon, Shenzhen, Etiler, London (Mayfair), Lucerne (renovated Hotel Palace Luzern), Moscow, Muscat, Riyadh, Tel Aviv, Zurich (renovated Savoy Baur en Ville Hotel), Boca Raton, Dallas, Grand Cayman, Honolulu, Vienna, Maldives and standalone residences in Barcelona, Beverly Hills and New York City.

Past
Notable former Mandarin Oriental properties include Hotel Majapahit, Loews Regency San Francisco, Waldorf Astoria Atlanta Buckhead, Mandarin Oriental Manila, Grand Lapa Macau, Waldorf Astoria Las Vegas, Salamander Washington DC and The Excelsior, as well as the spa Ananda in the Himalayas.

Incidents

Leslie Cheung suicide (2003)
On 1 April 2003, singer, actor and film producer Leslie Cheung leapt to his death from the 24th floor of the Mandarin Oriental in Central, Hong Kong. Every year on the anniversary of his death, a fan-organised memorial event takes place outside the hotel.

Beijing building fire during construction (2009)

On 9 February 2009, the Beijing Television Cultural Center, which was to be completed in May 2009 and incorporate a Mandarin Oriental hotel, caught fire due to unauthorized fireworks celebrating the Chinese New Year. One fireman died from the incident and the structure was severely damaged, but did not collapse and underwent repair. However, the Mandarin Oriental hotel ultimately opened at a different location at Wangfujing, near the Beijing Hotel and the spot of the "Unknown Rebel" picture during the Tiananmen Square protests in 1989.

Credit card breach (2015)
In March 2015, a number of Mandarin Oriental hotels were affected by a point-of-sale systems security breach.

Hyde Park fire (2018) 

On 6 June 2018, a fire (believed to have been caused by welding work) damaged the park-facing exterior of the Mandarin Oriental Hyde Park in London. Although there were no injuries, the fire closed the hotel and caused a major setback to the (then) near-complete renovation work, which involved interior designer Joyce Wang. The hotel returned to full operation on 15 April 2019.

Gallery

References

External links

 
Hospitality companies established in 1963
Companies formerly listed on the Hong Kong Stock Exchange
Companies listed on the London Stock Exchange
Companies listed on the Frankfurt Stock Exchange
Companies listed on the Singapore Exchange
Former companies in the Hang Seng Index
Hong Kong brands
Hongkong Land
Hospitality companies of Hong Kong
Hospitality companies of Singapore
Hotel chains in Singapore
Hospitality companies of the United States
Offshore companies of Bermuda
Hotel chains
Luxury brands
Multinational companies headquartered in Hong Kong